Bostrychus aruensis, the island gudgeon, is a species of fish in the family Eleotridae, an  endemic fish of the Aru Islands, Indonesia, where it occurs in both fresh and brackish waters.  It grows up to  SL.

References

Bostrichthys
Butidae
Freshwater fish of Indonesia
Taxonomy articles created by Polbot